Pterolophia suginoi is a species of beetle in the family Cerambycidae. It was described by Hiroshi Makihara in 1986. Its exact habitat is unknown, but it would be unable to live in an aquatic habitat. It is an accepted species, and it has the "accepted "species" taxonomic status.

References

suginoi
Beetles described in 1986